Heartless Husbands is a 1925 American silent drama film directed by Bertram Bracken and starring Gloria Grey, Thomas G. Lingham and Vola Vale.

Cast
 John T. Prince as James Carleton 
 Gloria Grey as Mary Kayne
 Thomas G. Lingham as Jackson Cain
 Vola Vale as Mrs. Jackson Cain
 Edna Hall as Minnie Blake
 L.J. O'Connor as Detective Kelly
 Waldo Moretti as Sonny

References

Bibliography
 Connelly, Robert B. The Silents: Silent Feature Films, 1910-36, Volume 40, Issue 2. December Press, 1998.
 Munden, Kenneth White. The American Film Institute Catalog of Motion Pictures Produced in the United States, Part 1. University of California Press, 1997.

External links
 

1925 films
1925 drama films
1920s English-language films
American silent feature films
Silent American drama films
Films directed by Bertram Bracken
American black-and-white films
1920s American films